Roberto Themis Speroni (1922, La Plata –1967) was an Argentine writer.

Argentine male writers
1922 births
1967 deaths
People from La Plata
Burials at La Plata Cemetery